Mohamed Ben Checkroun (born 9 April 1937) is a Moroccan modern pentathlete. He competed at the 1960 Summer Olympics.

References

1937 births
Living people
Moroccan male modern pentathletes
Olympic modern pentathletes of Morocco
Modern pentathletes at the 1960 Summer Olympics
Sportspeople from Casablanca